Achomi, also known as Larestani and Khodmooni, is a Southwestern Iranian Persian language spoken by  people in southern Fars and western Hormozgan and by significant numbers of immigrant groups in Kuwait, Bahrain, Iraq, Qatar, the United Arab Emirates and other Persian Gulf Arab countries. It is the predominant language of Larestan, Khonj, Gerash, Lamerd, and Evaz counties in Fars and Bastak County in Hormozgan Province. It is also spoken by some Huwalas in the Gulf countries. The majority of Achomi speakers are Sunni Muslims.

Etymology and name of the language 
There are different ways to refer to this language.
Achomi: Native speakers often refer to their language as Achomi. There are different reasons for this name. One of them is the language's frequent usage of the [tʃ] consonant. The second reason originates from when Arabs began trading with Achomis. This because Arabs called Achomis 'Ajam', which means non-Arab. Therefore, Achomi is a variation of Ajam. Additionally, Achomi can be linked to Achom, which means 'I go' in the language.

Khodmooni: In Arab states surrounding the Persian Gulf, Achomis are referred to as Khodmooni'. This translates to "of our own kind".

Larestani: UNESCO mentions Larestani as a name for Achomi. This name comes from Larestan, where the language's speakers reside. Etymologically, 'Lar' comes from 'Lad' which means "the origin of everything".

 Lari: This language is sometimes called Lari. To reiterate, 'Lar' originates from 'Lad' which means "the origin of everything".It is also important to note that Lari can be used to refer to a dialect or a language.

History 
The Achomi language can be considered a descendant of the Sassanid Persian language or Middle Persian.

Achomi language and its various local dialects such as Lari, Evazi, Khonji, Gerashi, Bastaki, etc., is the branch of the Middle Persian (Pahlavi) language of the Sassanid Empire.

Today, the language is known as an endangered language. In particular, UNESCO refers to it as a "definitely endangered" language with approximately 80,000 speakers. It also does not have official language status in Iran. This is because Iran only recognizes Persian as an official language. However, Iran allows the use of minority languages, such as Achomi, in the media and the education system (alongside Persian). Nevertheless, Achomi remains an endangered language with many dialectal differences gradually disappearing because of the domination of Persian.

Many Iranians moved to Arab States in order to pursue better economic opportunities. This included Achomis. These Achomis are often multilingual. Achomi migrants still speak this language in their homes, however, this variety has been influenced by the Arabic language a little but is mutually intelligible with standard Persian.

Classification 
The language is a branch of the Pahlavi language. This means that it shares the ergative structure of Pahlavi. It is also an analytical language. This can be linked back to its membership in the southwestern branch of Middle-Iranian languages.

With the exception of the regional accent, pronunciation of certain words, and a slight variation in grammar, this old language has been the common language of the Southwestern Pars Province and parts of Hormozgan Province for nearly 1,800 years despite the various conquests of the region since the fall of the Sassanid Empire.

Dialects 
Achomi has many dialects. These dialects correspond to Larestan's different towns. Examples of these dialects include Lari,  Evazi, Gerashi, Khonji and Bastaki.These dialectical variations may present themselves through pronunciation. There may also be grammatical and word differences between the dialects. Hence, if the speaker is from Evaz, they are referred as speaking Evazi, and if they are from Bastak their dialect is known as Bastaki.

An example of a dialectal variation: in some particular regions, Achomi people say raftom for "I went" (very similar to the Persian raftam), but in some other regions, just as Lar people, they say  (Kurdish: dichim or dechim) instead.

Samples

Verbs 

To make simple past verbs

The ids (om / ot / osh / mo / tosho) + The simple past root of the first type

Example:

Omgot: I said

oshbu: you (You could be referring to one or more) won

Tokha: You (has to be more than two people) ate

And ...

The root of the past simple second type + ids (am / esh / ruleless / em / eh / et)
Example:

Chedam: a to be shortened! I went

Khatesh: Sleep

bodem: we got

And...

Passive 
To create a passive verb in past tense we can use the verb root plus its proper prefix. For example, in Achomi, the root for the verb "to tell" is got (gota equals "tell").

omgot (om+got), Kurdish (migot or min got) = I told ...

 (om+got), Kurdish = You told...

 (osh+got), Kurdish = He told...

 (mo+got), Kurdish = We told...

 (to+got), Kurdish pl = You (pl) told

 (sho+got), Kurdish = They told

Another example: "deda" means "see," and "dee" Kurdish (Deed or dee) is the root verb. So:

omdee = I saw, Kurdish

otdee= you saw, Kurdish (tu-te dee)....

To create a simple present or continued present tense of a passive verb, here's another example:

agota'em (a+got+aem):I am telling...

agota'esh (a+got+aesh): You are telling...

agotay (a+got+ay): He is telling...

agota'am (a+got+a'am): We are telling...

agotay (a+got+ay): You (pl) are telling...

agota'en (a+got+a'en): They are telling...

For the verb "see" ("deda"):

adead'em, adeda'esh, adeaday,...

References

Southwestern Iranian languages
Languages of Iran